Tullia is a Roman feminine name, originally the feminine form of the patrician gentile name Tullius, as in : 
 Tullia Minor, the last queen of pre-Republican Rome
 Tullia (daughter of Cicero) (79–45 BC), the daughter of the Roman orator and republican politician Cicero

It may also refer to :

 Places and jurisdictions
 Tullia, Numidia, formerly an Ancient Roman town and diocese in Numidia, presently in Algeria and a Latin  Catholic titular see

 Female given name
 Tullia d'Aragona (c.1510–1556), Italian courtesan and poet
 Tullia Magrini (1950–2005), Italian anthropologist
 Tullia Zevi, (1919–2011) a 20th-century journalist

 Biology
 synonym of the mint genus Pycnanthemum